Starting from the emergence and prominence of Wu-Tang Clan in the mid-1990s, several of the group's members have branched out to create their labels following RZA's lead. Some of the labels have dissolved, while other labels have transitioned into other labels. Also included in this list are some of the group members and affiliates that were/are signed to them.

Wu-Tang Records
A label that existed in the mid 1990s. Although never publicly stated, it is believed that RZA was the CEO. The only known acts on the label were Shyheim, Wu-Syndicate, Killarmy, and Sunz of Man. The current situation of the label is unknown. It was distributed by Priority/EMI Records.

Black Knights
Killarmy
Royal Fam
Shyheim
Sunz of Man
U-God
Northstar
Wu-Syndicate
Inspectah Deck
Masta Killa

Razor Sharp Records
Razor Sharp Records is a recording label that was believed to also be run by RZA. However, the label was run by his brother, Divine. The label was founded in the early 1990s around the time that RZA produced Method Man's Tical, Raekwon's Only Built 4 Cuban Linx..., Ol' Dirty Bastard's Return to the 36 Chambers: The Dirty Version, The GZA's Liquid Swords and Ghostface Killah's Ironman. Although the label received returning profits and proceeds on every album made by each clan member, very few acts were seen on the label, most notably Cappadonna, who had close ties with the group, and was often believed to be an unofficial member, until his official induction prior to 8 Diagrams. Sophia Chang was the manager of this label in 1999. The current situation of the label is unknown, although it is possible that the label dissolved or possibly became one of the more recent Wu labels. It was distributed by Epic Records & Sony Music. RZA relaunched Razor Sharp Records with Mike Smith and King Tech.

Cappadonna
Ghostface Killah
Tekitha
 Chanel Sosa
Jammie Sommers

36 Chambers Records and Wu Music Group
Other record labels, known as 36 Chambers Records and Wu Music Group were also founded, and are still active in the present. Very little is known about these labels, other that the fact that RZA produces music and movie scores on them. Wu Music Group receives profit on every album that is released from a Clan member. His involvement with these labels are deeply uncertain, considering that he was never known to be CEO of any recording label.

Solomon Childs
Boy Jones

Wu-Tang International
Another label founded by the RZA. Unlike the other labels, it signed hip-hop talent from countries outside of the United States. Cilvaringz was signed to the label. Wu-Tang International does not exist as a label any longer. A web site dedicated to Wu-Tang under the same name exists and covers everything Wu-Tang across the globe: wu-international.com 

Cilvaringz

Soul Temple Records

Upon completion of his film directorial debut work The Man with the Iron Fists, RZA founded Soul Temple Records. The label has since released Ghostface Killah's Twelve Reasons to Die and U-God's solo album Keynote Speaker both executive produced by RZA. The label has also released Wu-Tang Clan's sixth studio album A Better Tomorrow.

Liquid Swords Entertainment
An independent record label founded by the GZA. Created in 2008 with the GZA's first release for the label, Pro Tools. It is distributed through a partnership with Babygrande Records.

GZA
Reverend William Burke

References

Hip hop record labels
American record labels